is a Japanese football player currently playing for Zweigen Kanazawa.

Club statistics
Updated to end of 2018 season.

References

External links

Profile at Zweigen Kanazawa

1987 births
Living people
University of Tsukuba alumni
Association football people from Ishikawa Prefecture
Japanese footballers
J2 League players
J3 League players
Mito HollyHock players
Oita Trinita players
Montedio Yamagata players
Zweigen Kanazawa players
Association football defenders